Mary Beth Evans (born March 7, 1961) is an American television actress, known for her role as Kayla Brady on the NBC daytime soap Days of Our Lives, and her role as Sierra Estaban on the CBS daytime soap As the World Turns.

Career
Evans is most famous for portraying Kayla Brady on the NBC soap opera Days of Our Lives from 1986 to 1992, 2006 to 2009, and 2010 to present. In the 1980s, her character became half of the supercouple Steve and Kayla, with Steve "Patch" Johnson played by Stephen Nichols. In regard to Steve and Kayla’s first wedding, which was one of the biggest in “Days’” history, Evans remarked, “I think it was number one? And that wedding was just so extravagant. It was outside, which was a big deal on a daytime show. It was beautiful.”  Evans left the show in 1992 but returned (with Nichols) on June 12, 2006 after a fourteen-year absence. In 2009, Evans and Nichols were written off Days of Our Lives. Evans returned in 2010 and has appeared on a recurring basis every year since. In 2015, she was placed back on contract with the series.

Prior to her first stint on Days of our Lives, Evans portrayed Piper in the teen romantic comedy flick Lovelines. She has guest-starred in number of primetime television series, including Madame’s Place, Father Murphy, Knight Rider, Masquerade, Remington Steele, Riptide, Murder, She Wrote, Law & Order: Special Victims Unit, Monk, Criminal Minds, and Body of Proof.

Evans appeared on other daytime soap operas between her stints at Days of Our Lives. In September 1993, she began playing the villainous  Katherine Bell on General Hospital (and later on Port Charles) until October 1999.  Evans moved to New York City to play Sierra Estaban on As the World Turns from December 2000 to late 2005, later reprising the role from July 2010 until the show's finale on September 17, 2010. In 2005, One Life to Live almost signed her on contract for the role of Dr. Paige Miller, but Evans backed out at the last moment and the role was filled with Kimberlin Brown.

Since 2010, Evans has starred on the soap opera web series The Bay as Sara Garrett. As a producer for the series, she won a 2015 Daytime Emmy Award for Outstanding New Approaches Drama Series. In 2016, Evans was nominated again as a producer, as well as in the category Outstanding Actress in a Digital Daytime Drama Series for portraying Sara. The same year she was also nominated in the category of Outstanding Lead Actress in a Drama Series for Days of Our Lives. Evans won all three. She won two more Emmys in 2017 for The Bay, for Outstanding Lead Actress in a Digital Daytime Drama Series and as a producer for Outstanding Digital Daytime Drama Series.

In 2014 and 2015 Evans also appeared as Catherine Hendrie on the ABC Family drama series Chasing Life.

Personal life
Evans was born in Pasadena, California and grew up in Orange County, California.
She married cosmetic surgeon Michael Schwartz on November 3, 1985. They have three children, Daniel Luke (born 1987), Katherine Elizabeth (born 1990), and Matthew Joseph (born 1993).

Filmography

Film

Television

Awards and nominations

References

External links
 

1961 births
Living people
20th-century American actresses
21st-century American actresses
American television actresses
American soap opera actresses
Daytime Emmy Award winners
Daytime Emmy Award for Outstanding Lead Actress in a Drama Series winners
Actresses from Orange County, California
Actresses from Pasadena, California